The Shades of Love were an electronic dance studio act which included Meli'sa Morgan as lead singer. Hailing from New York City, their best known material is "Keep in Touch". The original version entered the US dance charts in 1982, where it peaked at #26. In 1995, a remix of the song was released and hit number on the US dance charts.

History
The "band" debuted with an uptempo number "Come Inside", released by Scorpgemi Records in 1979. The next singles, released by the same record label, "Do Your Own Dance" and "Come and Make Me Feel Good" helped shape their typical sound. "Come and Make Me Feel Good" and the infamous "Keep in Touch (Body to Body)" were produced, arranged and written by Lonnie Johnson and Patrick Adams.

Chart performance

Discography

Partial singles
"Keep In Touch (Body to Body)", 1982

Other singles
"Come Inside" (1979, Scorpgemi Records)
"Do Your Own Dance" (1981, Scorpgemi Records) 
"Come And Make Me Feel Good" (1982, Scorpgemi Records)
"Come and Make Me Feel Good (Remix)" (1983, Scorpgemi Records)

See also
 List of number-one dance singles of 1995 (U.S.)

References

American boogie musicians
American garage house musicians
American hi-NRG groups
American dance music groups
Electronic music groups from New York (state)
Musical groups from New York City
Musical groups established in 1979